Flickan i en Cole Porter-sång is a song written by Per Gessle, and recorded by Gyllene Tider on the album Puls. It also released as a single on 7 December 1982, and also featured Kjell Öhman playing the accordion. The single became a hit in Denmark. The song was also recorded in English, as "That Girl in a Cole Porter song".

The opening and closing riff of the song includes the main riff of the actual Cole Porter song I Get A Kick Out Of You, from the musical Anything Goes.

Track listing
Flickan i en Cole Porter-sång - 3:48
I Go to Pieces - 2:40

Charts

References 

1982 singles
1982 songs
Gyllene Tider songs
Songs written by Per Gessle
Swedish-language songs
EMI Records singles
Songs about musicians
Cultural depictions of Cole Porter